The Brevet de Technicien is an educational qualification. The term may refer to: 
Brevet de Technicien Supérieur of France
Brevet de Technicien of Mauritius